In Person is a 1935 romantic musical comedy film starring Ginger Rogers and George Brent.

Plot summary
Glamorous movie star Carol Corliss (Ginger Rogers) suffers from agoraphobia. Her fear of large groups of people, including her adoring fans, causes the actress to assume a veiled, buck-toothed disguise whenever in public. Carol's psychiatrist, Dr. Aaron Sylvester (Samuel S. Hinds), recommends a vacation in the mountains as a cure. After she faints in a large crowd, outdoorsman Emory Muir (George Brent) rescues her, never believing the drab woman could be a movie star. Carol pretends to be the plain Miss Clara Colfax and convinces Muir to take her to his mountain retreat to recover. He reluctantly agrees, and allows Carol to stay in the lake cabin.

There, George sees her swimming undisguised and wonders as to her true identity. George phones her psychiatrist, who declines to name his patient. While in town, George discovers a picture of Carol Corliss and realizes his guest "Clara" is, in fact, the famous actress. Upon his return, Carol decides to reveal herself to George, but he acts unimpressed and refuses to believe her. In the cabin, Carol hears herself on the radio singing "Got a New Lease on Life," and she sings and dances along for George to no avail. He is only "convinced" of her real persona once she takes him to the movie theatre where her newest film is showing.

Over time, Carol begins to realize she is falling for George. Matters are complicated further when Carol's frequent film co-star, Jay Holmes (Alan Mowbray), arrives at the lake to confess his love for her.

Cast
 Ginger Rogers as Carol Corliss/Clara Colfax
 George Brent as Emory Muir
 Alan Mowbray as Jay Holmes
 Grant Mitchell as Judge Thaddeus Parks
 Samuel S. Hinds as Dr. Aaron Sylvester
 Joan Breslau as Minna
 Louis Mason as Sheriff Twing
 Spencer Charters as Parson Calverton Lunk

Production
In November 1934, the Hollywood Reporter wrote that Fred Astaire had been RKO's first choice for the male lead in the film. The studio borrowed George Brent from Warner Bros. for the role. Additionally, Ginger Rogers stated in her autobiography that Katharine Hepburn had turned down the role of Carol before Rogers accepted.

Released at the height of the Astaire/Rogers musical partnership, In Person was first and foremost a vehicle to showcase Ginger Rogers' singing and dancing. On a title lobby card for the film, she is billed as "Fresh from her great triumph in 'Top Hat'". Rogers wanted to prove to her public that she was more than just Astaire's dancing partner, and this film highlights her talents as a comedienne.

Parts of the film were shot on location at Big Bear Lake in California.

Music
Rogers performed three musical numbers in the film: "Got a New Lease on Life", "Don't Mention Love To Me" and "Out of Sight, Out of Mind". The score was written by Oscar Levant (music) and Dorothy Fields (lyrics).

Reception

Box office
The film made a modest box-office profit of $147,000, largely due to the strength of Ginger Rogers' popularity.

Critical response
In Person was well-received, but neither it nor its star could escape the shadow of the Astaire/Rogers musicals. In The Fred Astaire and Ginger Rogers Book, dance historian and critic Arlene Croce writes of the film, "Rogers' charm was irresistible, her skill variable." Croce goes on to highlight the difference between the musical numbers of In Person and those of the following Astaire/Rogers film Follow the Fleet; "[Rogers] goes ersatz in "Out of Sight, Out of Mind," slinking with a studiously lighted cigarette among men in dinner jackets, looking like a junior miss caught out in Ladies' Evening Wear. Yet only a year later she was the cream of sophistication in "Let's Face the Music and Dance. The difference: Astaire."

References

External links 
 In Person at IMDb
 
 
 

1935 romantic comedy films
1935 films
American romantic comedy films
American black-and-white films
Films directed by William A. Seiter
1930s American films